Kinshasa is a municipality (commune) in the Lukunga district of the city of Kinshasa, the capital of the Democratic Republic of the Congo. It is situated in the north of the city, south of Gombe and the Boulevard du 30 Juin.

History 

The word nshasa translates as "marsh". Henry Morton Stanley founded the station next to it after signing a treaty with the Teke chief Ntsuvila in the later half of the 19th century. It was linked by steam boat with other stations along the river and the Stanley Pool. With the foundation and expansion of neighbouring Léopoldville Station, it became, along with Barumbu, Gombe and Lingwala, part of the city in the beginning of the 20th century.

With the Africanization program initiated by President Mobutu in 1966, the name of the entire city was changed to Kinshasa, based on the original village.

See also

Communes of Kinshasa

References

External links 
 

Communes of Kinshasa
Lukunga District